The 2014–15 SHL season was the 40th season of the Swedish Hockey League (SHL). The regular season began on 10 September 2014 and ended on 5 March 2015. The following playoffs began on 12 March and ended on 23 April 2015.

Skellefteå AIK won the regular season for the third consecutive season. Växjö Lakers won the Swedish Championship title by defeating Skellefteå in six games in a series where none of the two teams won at home until Växjö in game six. The title was Växjö's first in only their second play-off appearance.

Modo Hockey and Leksands IF were forced to play in the Direktkval till SHL to defend their SHL status. Modo swept the series against HC Vita Hästen while Leksand lost to Malmö Redhawks over seven games. Therefore Malmö were promoted to the SHL on the expense of Leksand.

Pre-season 
On 29 April 2014, the Swedish Sports Confederation (RF) informed that Modo Hockey player Edwin Hedberg had tested positive for the banned substance sibutramine in February. Hedberg voluntarily suspended himself for the duration of the investigation. On 9 July 2014, the RF handed Hedberg a six-month suspension from all organised sporting activity; the suspension ended on 24 October 2014.

On 7 July 2014, the RF suspended Luleå HF goaltender Mark Owuya from all sporting activity for one year. The verdict came due to an incident in February, in which Owuya disappeared without supervision during out-of-competition testing for doping. Owuya would have missed the entire 2014–15 season as a result, but appealed the decision to the top instance of the RF on 28 July 2014. On 4 September 2014, the instance decided to lift the suspension.

Regular season

Standings

Statistics

Scoring leaders 
 
List shows the ten best skaters based on the number of points during the regular season. If two or more skaters are tied (i.e. same number of points, goals and played games), all of the tied skaters are shown.

GP = Games played; G = Goals; A = Assists; Pts = Points; +/– = Plus/minus; PIM = Penalty minutes

Leading goaltenders 
These are the leaders in GAA among goaltenders who played at least 40% of the team's minutes. The table is sorted by GAA, and the criteria for inclusion are bolded.

GP = Games played; TOI = Time on ice (minutes); GA = Goals against; SO = Shutouts; Sv% = Save percentage; GAA = Goals against average

Playoffs 
The top six teams will qualify directly for the playoffs, while the four teams ranked 7–10 will play a best-of-three series and battle for the two remaining playoff spots.

Play-in 
The teams ranked 7 and 10, and the teams ranked 8 and 9, respectively, will face each other in a best-of-three series in order to qualify for the playoffs. The better-ranked teams in the two series will receive home advantage, i.e. two home games, if necessary. The two winners will take the two remaining playoff spots.

(7) Färjestad BK vs. (10) Brynäs IF

(8) Luleå HF vs. (9) Djurgårdens IF

Playoff bracket 
In the first round, the top-ranked team will face the lowest-ranked winner of the two best-of-three series, the 2nd-ranked team will face the other winner of the two best-of-three series, the 3rd-ranked team will face the 6th-ranked team, and the 4th-ranked team will face the 5th-ranked team. In the second round, the highest remaining seed is matched against the lowest remaining seed. In each round the higher-seeded team is awarded home advantage. Each series is a best-of-seven series that follows an alternating home team format: the higher-seeded team will play at home for games 1 and 3 (plus 5 and 7 if necessary), and the lower-seeded team will be at home for game 2 and 4 (plus 6 if necessary).

Quarterfinals

(1) Skellefteå AIK vs. (10) Brynäs IF

(2) Frölunda HC vs. (8) Luleå HF

(3) Växjö Lakers vs. (6) Örebro HK

(4) Linköpings HC vs. (5) HV71

Semifinals

(1) Skellefteå AIK vs. (4) Linköpings HC

(2) Frölunda HC vs. (3) Växjö Lakers

Finals

Statistics

Playoff scoring leaders 
 
List shows the ten best skaters based on the number of points during the playoffs. If two or more skaters are tied (i.e. same number of points, goals and played games), all of the tied skaters are shown.

GP = Games played; G = Goals; A = Assists; Pts = Points; +/– = Plus/minus; PIM = Penalty minutes

Playoff leading goaltenders 
These are the leaders in GAA and save percentage among goaltenders who played at least 40% of the team's minutes. The table is sorted by GAA, and the criteria for inclusion are bolded.

GP = Games played; TOI = Time on ice (minutes); GA = Goals against; SO = Shutouts; Sv% = Save percentage; GAA = Goals against average

SHL awards

See also 
 List of SHL seasons
 2014 in ice hockey
 2015 in ice hockey
 2014–15 HockeyAllsvenskan season

References

External links

 
2014-15
1
Swe